John Paul Thompson (born 12 October 1981) is an Irish former professional footballer. He was a tough-tackling versatile defender, although he was equally comfortable in midfield. He was a full Irish International who has also played for Nottingham Forest, Tranmere Rovers, Oldham Athletic, Notts County and Mansfield.

Career
Born in Dublin, Thompson started his career playing for his local team River Valley Rangers. At 14 years old, he joined top Dublin schoolboy club Home Farm. While at the Dublin club he represented the Republic of Ireland Under-15 team on 15 occasions. He progressed to the Republic Under-16 team and won the UEFA European Under-17 Football Championship in Scotland in 1998, playing right-back against Italy in the final.

He signed for Nottingham Forest at the age of 17 and progressed through the Forest Youth Academy under the guidance of Paul Hart and captained the Nottingham Forest Under-19 team to the Premier Academy League Title in 2000. It was a youth side which was also included Andy Reid, Jermaine Jenas and Michael Dawson.

Thompson made his full debut for Nottingham Forest against Sheffield United in 2002 at Bramall Lane in a 0–0 draw, with a man of the match performance . The following season, he made 25 appearances in a season where Forest narrowly missed out on the Premier League through the Championship Play-offs. He went on to make over 150 appearances for Forest, scoring eight goals, under such managers as Joe Kinnear, Gary Megson and Colin Calderwood. In his time at Forest he played with many top players such as Des Walker, Ricky Scimeca and David Johnson.

He also made his full International debut for the Republic of Ireland national football team in November 2003 coming on a substitute against Canada at Lansdowne Road. He had previously captained Republic of Ireland under-21 national football team under Don Givens. He is one of only a few players to represent Ireland at every level.

In 2006, Thompson joined Tranmere Rovers on loan and worked under Ronnie Moore where he made 14 appearances in two successful loan periods. In the summer of 2007 he joined Oldham Athletic but injuries limited his first team chances there and he made ten appearances before linking up with former Forest academy coach Ian McParland at Notts County in October 2008 on an initial loan deal.

In January 2009, he signed permanently for Notts County, where he has also worked under coaches Hans Backe, Ian McParland and Steve Cotterill and former Director of Football Sven-Goran Eriksson. He scored his first and second goal for Notts on 2 May 2009 against Wycombe Wanderers with two spectacular long range efforts. Thompson was the Notts County club captain for two and a half years.

On 27 April 2010, Notts County beat Darlington F.C. 5–0 to secure the Football League Two title, and promotion to Football League One. As well as lifting the trophy as captain, Thompson also played a vital part in the Notts County's defence which kept 26 clean sheets out of 46 league games.

Thompson made 25 appearances for Notts County in the 2010/2011 season under manager Martin Allen. On 10 May 2011, Martin Allen announced that he would not be offering Thompson a new contract at the current time but invited him back to the club in pre-season to train with a possibility of earning a new deal. Thompson chose not to return to the club.

Thompson was announced as Mansfield Town's latest signing in the early hours of 16 July 2011.
On 19 November 2011 he made his debut in the starting 11 against AFC Telford, the game ended 0–0  Thompson became another of the small band of players to have represented all three Nottinghamshire senior sides, five others being Trevor Christie, Darren Ward, Jason Lee, Colin Calderwood and Kieron Freeman.

Thompson announced his retirement from football on 30 April 2013 due to the mental scars left from a serious facial injury he received during a pre-season friendly against Ilkeston F.C. in August 2011. As of 2014, he is a regular presenter on Notts TV's "The Boot Room", giving analysis on his former clubs Nottingham Forest, Notts County and Mansfield Town.

Personal life
He graduated from the University of Salford with a degree in physiotherapy and now works as a sports physiotherapist for the National Health Service.

Honours
 UEFA U-17 Championship 
 Republic of Ireland 1998
 Football League Two
 Notts County F.C. 2009/10
 Conference Premier
 Mansfield Town F.C. 2012/13

References

External links

Ireland stats at 11v11

1981 births
Living people
Association footballers from Dublin (city)
Republic of Ireland association footballers
Republic of Ireland youth international footballers
Republic of Ireland under-21 international footballers
Republic of Ireland international footballers
Association football defenders
Nottingham Forest F.C. players
Tranmere Rovers F.C. players
Oldham Athletic A.F.C. players
Notts County F.C. players
Mansfield Town F.C. players
English Football League players
National League (English football) players
Alumni of the University of Salford
British physiotherapists